The 2020–21 QMJHL season was the 52nd season of the Quebec Major Junior Hockey League (QMJHL). The regular season began on October 2, 2020, and ended on April 18, 2021.

The playoffs began on April 23 and ended on June 5 with the Victoriaville Tigres winning the President's Cup as the QMJHL champion. Traditionally, the champion would have earned a berth in the 2021 Memorial Cup, which was to be hosted by the Ontario Hockey League from June 17 to 27, 2021, however, the Memorial Cup was cancelled for the second season in a row due to the restrictions during the ongoing COVID-19 pandemic. The QMJHL was the only Canadian Hockey League member to award a playoff champion in 2021 as the Ontario Hockey League completely cancelled its season and the Western Hockey League only had small regional tournaments.

Final standings

Source: TheQMJHL.ca

Note: GP = Games played; W = Wins; L = Losses; OTL = Overtime losses; SL = Shootout losses; GF = Goals for; GA = Goals against; PTS = Points; PTS%= Points percentage; x = clinched playoff berth; y = clinched division title; z = clinched Jean Rougeau Trophy

Scoring leaders
Note: GP = Games played; G = Goals; A = Assists; Pts = Points; PIM = Penalty minutes
Source: TheQMJHL.ca

Leading goaltenders
Note: GP = Games played; Mins = Minutes played; W = Wins; L = Losses: OTL = Overtime losses; SL = Shootout losses; GA = Goals Allowed; SO = Shutouts; GAA = Goals against average
Source: TheQMJHL.ca

Playoffs

Maritimes round-robin
Due to local travel restrictions, all Nova Scotia-based teams were deemed ineligible to compete in the playoffs. Three New Brunswick-based teams competed in a nine-game round-robin tournament to determine who would face the Charlottetown Islanders in the Maritimes division final.

Playoff bracket
Final results:

First round

Quebec divisions

(1) Val-d'Or Foreurs vs. (12) Baie-Comeau Drakkar

(2) Chicoutimi Saguenéens vs. (11) Sherbrooke Phoenix

(3) Shawinigan Cataractes vs. (10) Rimouski Océanic

(4) Victoriaville Tigres vs. (9) Rouyn-Noranda Huskies

(5) Blainville-Boisbriand Armada vs. (8) Gatineau Olympiques

(6) Quebec Remparts vs. (7) Drummondville Voltigeurs

Quarterfinals

Quebec Divisions

(1) Val-d'Or Foreurs vs. (6) Rimouski Océanic

(2) Chicoutimi Saguenéens vs. (5) Quebec Remparts

(3) Victoriaville Tigres vs. (4) Blainville-Boisbriand Armada

Maritimes Division

(1) Charlottetown Islanders vs. (2) Acadie–Bathurst Titan

Semifinals

(1) Charlottetown Islanders vs. (4) Victoriaville Tigres

(2) Val-d'Or Foreurs vs. (3) Chicoutimi Saguenéens

Finals

(2) Val-d'Or Foreurs vs. (4) Victoriaville Tigres

Playoff leading scorers
Note: GP = Games played; G = Goals; A = Assists; Pts = Points; PIM = Penalties minutes

Playoff leading goaltenders

Note: GP = Games played; Mins = Minutes played; W = Wins; L = Losses: OTL = Overtime losses; SL = Shootout losses; GA = Goals Allowed; SO = Shutouts; GAA = Goals against average

Trophies and awards
President's Cup – Playoff Champions: Victoriaville Tigres
Jean Rougeau Trophy – Regular Season Champions: Charlottetown Islanders
Luc Robitaille Trophy – Team with the best goals for average: Charlottetown Islanders
Robert Lebel Trophy – Team with best GAA: Val-d'Or Foreurs

Player
Michel Brière Memorial Trophy – Most Valuable Player: Cédric Desruisseaux, Charlottetown Islanders
Jean Béliveau Trophy – Top Scorer: Cédric Desruisseaux, Charlottetown Islanders
Guy Lafleur Trophy – Playoff MVP: Benjamin Tardif, Victoriaville Tigres
Jacques Plante Memorial Trophy – Top Goaltender: Colten Ellis, Charlottetown Islanders
Guy Carbonneau Trophy – Best Defensive Forward: Dawson Mercer, Chicoutimi Saguenéens
Emile Bouchard Trophy – Defenceman of the Year: Lukas Cormier, Charlottetown Islanders
Kevin Lowe Trophy – Best Defensive Defenceman: Noah Laaouan, Charlottetown Islanders
Michael Bossy Trophy – Top Prospect: Zachary Bolduc, Rimouski Océanic
RDS Cup – Rookie of the Year: Tristan Luneau, Gatineau Olympiques
Michel Bergeron Trophy – Offensive Rookie of the Year: Antonin Verreault, Gatineau Olympiques
Raymond Lagacé Trophy – Defensive Rookie of the Year: Tristan Luneau, Gatineau Olympiques
Frank J. Selke Memorial Trophy – Most sportsmanlike player: Dawson Mercer, Chicoutimi Saguenéens
QMJHL Humanitarian of the Year – Humanitarian of the Year: Anthony D'Amours, Rimouski Océanic
Marcel Robert Trophy – Best Scholastic Player: Jacob Gaucher, Val-d'Or Foreurs
Paul Dumont Trophy – Personality of the Year: Nicolas Sauvé, Blainville-Boisbriand Armada

Executive
Ron Lapointe Trophy – Coach of the Year: Jim Hulton, Charlottetown Islanders
Maurice Filion Trophy – General Manager of the Year: Jim Hulton, Charlottetown Islanders

All-Star Teams 
First All-Star Team:
 Colten Ellis, Goaltender, Charlottetown Islanders
 Lukas Cormier, Defenceman, Charlottetown Islanders
 Jordan Spence, Defenceman, Val-d'Or Foreurs
 Cédric Desruisseaux, Forward, Charlottetown Islanders
 Dawson Mercer, Forward, Chicoutimi Saguenéens
 Jakob Pelletier, Forward, Val-d'Or Foreurs

Second All-Star Team
 Jonathan Lemieux, Goaltender, Val-d'Or Foreurs
 Noah Laaouan, Defenceman, Charlottetown Islanders
 Justin Barron, Defenceman, Halifax Mooseheads
 Elliot Desnoyers, Forward, Halifax Mooseheads
 Mathieu Desgagnés, Forward, Acadie–Bathurst Titan
 Thomas Casey, Forward, Charlottetown Islanders

All-Rookie Team:
 Chad Arsenault, Goaltender, Acadie–Bathurst Titan
 Tristan Luneau, Defenceman, Gatineau Olympiques
 Evan Nause, Defenceman, Quebec Remparts
 Justin Côté, Forward, Drummondville Voltigeurs
 Peter Reynolds, Forward, Saint John Sea Dogs
 Antonin Verreault, Forward, Gatineau Olympiques

References

External links
 Official QMJHL website
 Official CHL website
 Official Memorial Cup website

Quebec Major Junior Hockey League seasons
Qmjhl